The 1917 Lafayette football team was an American football team that represented Lafayette College as an independent during the 1917 college football season. In its first and only season under head coach Punk Berryman, the team compiled a 3–5 record. Henry Lehr and Grant Scott were the team captains.  The team played its home games at March Field in Easton, Pennsylvania.

Schedule

References

Lafayette
Lafayette Leopards football seasons
Lafayette football